Gennady Petrovich Korkin (born 23 August 1963) is a retired Russian professional association football player. Currently, he works as a director for FC Metallurg Lipetsk.

He scored eight goals in one match in a 1996 Russian Third League game for FC Spartak Anapa against PFC Spartak-d Nalchik (a 13:0 win). That was a record for most goals in one game in Russian professional football he shared with Andrey Tikhonov and Sergey Maslov until Igor Kiselyov scored ten goals in one game in 2001.

Honours
Russian Third League Zone 1 top scorer: 1996 (23 goals).

References

1963 births
Living people
Soviet footballers
Russian footballers
Russian expatriate footballers
Russian football managers
FC Metallurg Lipetsk managers
FC Spartak Vladikavkaz players
FC Dinamo Minsk players
Olympiakos Nicosia players
FC Metallurg Lipetsk players
FC Zvezda Irkutsk players
Cypriot First Division players
Expatriate footballers in Finland
Expatriate footballers in Cyprus
Russian expatriate sportspeople in Finland
Russian expatriate sportspeople in Cyprus
Pallo-Kerho 37 players
Association football forwards
FC Spartak-UGP Anapa players